The American College of Gastroenterology (ACG) is a Bethesda, Maryland–based medical association of gastroenterologists.

The association was founded in 1932 and holds annual meetings and regional postgraduate continuing education courses, establishes research grants, and publishes The American Journal of Gastroenterology, Clinical and Translational Gastroenterology and The ACG Case Reports Journal. More than 18,000 physicians from 86 countries are members of the ACG.  The ACG provides its members with scientific information on digestive health and the etiology, symptomatology and treatment of GI disorders.

The current president (2022–23) is Daniel J. Pambianco, MD, FACG.

See also
 Gastroenterology
 The American Journal of Gastroenterology

References

External links
 Official website

Medical associations based in the United States
Gastroenterology organizations
Organizations established in 1932
Medical and health organizations based in Maryland